Hero Beauregard Faulkner  Fiennes Tiffin (born 6 November 1997) is an English actor, model and film producer. He is known for his starring role as Hardin Scott in the After film series. He portrayed 11-year-old Tom Riddle, the young version of the antagonist Lord Voldemort who is played by his uncle Ralph Fiennes, in the film Harry Potter and the Half-Blood Prince.

Early life
Hero Fiennes Tiffin was born in London on 6 November 1997, the son of film director Martha Fiennes and cinematographer George Tiffin. He has an older brother named Titan and a younger sister named Mercy. He does not hyphenate his name because his parents were never married. He was educated at Reay Primary School in Lambeth, Emanuel School in Battersea, and Graveney School in Tooting. He is a member of the Twisleton-Wykeham-Fiennes family; his great-grandfather was Maurice Fiennes, and his uncles are actors Ralph and Joseph Fiennes. His maternal grandparents were photographer Mark Fiennes and novelist Jennifer Lash.

Career
Prior to his acting career, Fiennes Tiffin worked jobs as a landscaper and caterer. He made his first film appearance as Spartak in the 2008 drama film Bigga Than Ben. He got the part of Tom Riddle in Harry Potter and the Half-Blood Prince from thousands of young actors who auditioned for the role, though at least one publication alleged that his family connections alone landed him the part. Director David Yates said he was cast due to his ability to find "the darker space" in his line readings, and that he did not get the role due to his relation to Ralph Fiennes, his uncle who plays Voldemort, but admitted the family resemblance was a "clincher". Yates described Fiennes Tiffin as "very focused and disciplined" and said he "got the corners and dark moods and odd spirit of the character" as well as having a "wonderful haunted quality that seemed to bring Tom Riddle alive on-screen for us".

Fiennes Tiffin portrayed Ioan Fuller, a teenager involved in a friend's disappearance in Safe, a 2017 British TV drama series created by crime author Harlan Coben and starring Michael C. Hall. In 2019, Fiennes Tiffin was cast in the lead role of Hardin Scott in the film After, based on the book of the same name by Anna Todd. The film was released in April 2019, grossing $69.7m worldwide. He returned for his role as Hardin Scott in the sequel, After We Collided, which was released in September 2020; and again reprises his role for the sequels After We Fell and After Ever Happy which were filmed simultaneously in late 2020 and released in 2021 and 2022 respectively. 

He portrayed Brooks Gustafson in the thriller film The Silencing, released in July 2020. In May 2021, Fiennes Tiffin was announced to be starring as the lead in the romantic drama First Love. In October 2021, Fiennes Tiffin was announced among the cast of the historical drama The Woman King. In May 2022 he joined the cast of action thriller The Climb, a film based on the 2013 Greenpeace protest where activists illegally scaled The Shard in London in protest against Arctic oil drilling. 

Fiennes Tiffin is signed with modeling agency Storm Management and has modeled for Dolce & Gabbana, Dior, H&M, Hugo Boss, and Superdry. In November 2019, he was named the face of the new Salvatore Ferragamo S.p.A. fragrance, Ferragamo.

Filmography

Awards and nominations

References

External links
 
 

Living people
1997 births
21st-century English male actors
English male child actors
English male film actors
English people of Irish descent
English people of Scottish descent
Hero
Male actors from London
English male models